Francesc Xavier "Xavi" Molina Arias (born 19 July 1986) is a Spanish footballer who plays for CF Badalona as a central defender or a defensive midfielder.

Club career
Born in La Canonja, Tarragona, Catalonia, Molina graduated from local CF Reus Deportiu's youth academy, but made his senior debut while on loan at UE Rapitenca in the Tercera División. After being sparingly used in his return he rejoined the latter club for the 2007–08 season, where he excelled.

Molina was an undisputed starter for Reus the following campaign, appearing in 30 matches and scoring once as the team missed out promotion in the play-offs. In the summer of 2009, he signed for CD Alcoyano of the Segunda División B.

After being a regular in his first year at Alcoy, Molina missed most of his second (which ended in promotion) due to injury. On 17 December 2011 he played his first match as a professional, coming on as a second-half substitute in a 3–2 away loss against Real Murcia in the Segunda División.

Molina moved to CD Atlético Baleares of the third division on 31 July 2012. On 13 July of the following year, he joined Gimnàstic de Tarragona in the same league, earning another promotion at the end of 2014–15. He scored his first goal in the second tier on 23 August 2015, his side's first in the 2–2 home draw with Albacete Balompié.

On 7 June 2018, aged nearly 32, Molina moved abroad for the first time in his career after signing for K.A.S. Eupen. His first appearance in top-flight football took place on 29 July, in a 5–2 Belgian First Division A defeat at Club Brugge KV.

Molina returned to his country and its lower leagues subsequently, representing Córdoba CF and CF Badalona.

References

External links

1986 births
Living people
People from Tarragonès
Sportspeople from the Province of Tarragona
Spanish footballers
Footballers from Catalonia
Association football defenders
Association football midfielders
Association football utility players
Segunda División players
Segunda División B players
Tercera División players
Segunda Federación players
CF Reus Deportiu players
CD Alcoyano footballers
CD Atlético Baleares footballers
Gimnàstic de Tarragona footballers
Córdoba CF players
CF Badalona players
Belgian Pro League players
K.A.S. Eupen players
Spanish expatriate footballers
Expatriate footballers in Belgium
Spanish expatriate sportspeople in Belgium